Samabad castle is a historical castle located in Qom County in Qom Province, The longevity of this fortress dates back to the Qajar dynasty.

References 

Castles in Iran
Qajar castles